The National Hospital Insurance Fund (NHIF) is a Kenya government state corporation with a mandate to provide health insurance to Kenyans. The core business and mandate for NHIF is to provide accessible, affordable, sustainable and quality health insurance for all Kenyan citizens. The National Hospital Insurance Fund (NHIF) has published new NHIF rates which took effect on April 1, 2015.

History
NHIF was established in 1967 as a department within the ministry of health, by an Act of parliament. This has been reviewed over the years and it is now governed by ACT NO. 9 of 1998 - National Hospital Insurance Fund Act.

The core business and mandate for NHIF is to provide accessible, affordable, sustainable and quality health insurance for all Kenyan citizens. The National Hospital Insurance Fund (NHIF) has published new NHIF rates which took effect on April 1, 2015.

Scandals

NHIF Ambulance Scandal

In 2001 a scandal relating to irregularities in purchase of ambulances for the NHIF resulted in the sacking of the Minister for Medical Services Amukowa Anangwe.

Euro Bank Scandal

The NHIF is estimated to have lost 479m shillings in the collapse of Euro Bank after the bank collapsed with deposits from state corporations.

Civil Servants Scheme Scandal

In early 2012, the NHIF was embroiled in a controversy surrounding revelations on the Kenya Civil Servants Health Care Scheme.

References

Medical and health organisations based in Kenya
Government agencies of Kenya
Health insurance
Government-owned companies of Kenya